Adam Rzewuski (tr. ; 1801 – April 17, 1888) was a Polish-Russian general. He was born in Pohrebyshche in the Kiev Governorate of the Russian Empire (present-day Ukraine). He participated in wars in Poland and the Crimea. He died in Kiev.

He was married three times. In 1829 he married Alexandra Petrovna Lopukhina, daughter of Pyotr Lopukhin. After her death in 1852, he married Anna Dashkov, daughter of Dmitry Dashkov, with whom he had a daughter, Katarzyna. After the death of his second wife, he married  in 1860, with whom he had three sons: Stanisław, Adam Witold and Leon. He also had a natural son, Adam.

Awards 
 Order of Saint Anna, 3rd class, 1828
 Order of Saint Vladimir, 4th class, 1828
 Gold Sword for Bravery, 1831
 Order of Saint Anna, 2nd class, 1831
 Order of Saint Stanislaus (House of Romanov), 2nd class, 1835
 Order of Saint Vladimir, 3rd class, 1835
 Order of Saint George, 4th degree, 1841
 Order of Saint Stanislaus (House of Romanov), 1st class, 1847
 Order of Saint Anna, 1st class, 1852
 Order of Saint Vladimir, 2nd class, 1859
 Order of the White Eagle (Russian Empire), 1861
 Order of Saint Alexander Nevsky, 1863

References 

1801 births
1888 deaths
Rzewuski family
People from Pohrebyshche
People from Kiev Governorate
Imperial Russian Army generals
Russian people of the November Uprising
Recipients of the Order of St. Anna, 3rd class
Recipients of the Order of St. Vladimir, 4th class
Recipients of the Gold Sword for Bravery
Recipients of the Order of St. Anna, 2nd class
Recipients of the Order of Saint Stanislaus (Russian), 2nd class
Rzhevusky
Recipients of the Order of Saint Stanislaus (Russian), 1st class
Recipients of the Order of St. Anna, 1st class
Recipients of the Order of St. Vladimir, 2nd class
Recipients of the Order of the White Eagle (Russia)
Polish generals in the Imperial Russian Army
Polish people of the Crimean War (Russian side)